Gyralina is a genus of air-breathing land snails, terrestrial pulmonate gastropod mollusks in the family Pristilomatidae.

Species
Species within the genus Gyralina include:
 Gyralina candida (Wagner, 1909)
 Gyralina circumlineata (Pfeiffer, 1846)
 Gyralina hausdorfi Riedel, 1990, extinct

References
 AnimalBase page for the genus
 List of species with some shell images

Pristilomatidae
Gastropod genera